Vlad Dogaru (born February 21, 1985) is a Romanian professional basketball player for CSU Asesoft Ploiești of the Romanian League. He has won 3 titles with Asesoft between the years 2009 and 2012 and 3 times the Romanian National Cup.

References

1985 births
Living people
CSU Asesoft Ploiești players
Point guards
Sportspeople from Ploiești
Romanian men's basketball players
Shooting guards